The Kakori Train robbery (part of Kakori Conspiracy) was a train robbery that took place at Kakori, a village near Lucknow, on 9 August 1925, during the Indian independence movement against the British rule in India. It was organized by the Indian revolutionaries of Hindustan Republican Association (HRA).

 

The robbery was conceived by Ram Prasad Bismil and Ashfaqullah Khan who were members of HRA, which later became the Hindustan Socialist Republican Association. This organisation was established to carry out revolutionary activities against the suppression of British Empire with the objective of achieving independence. Since the organisation needed money for the purchase of weaponry, Bismil and his party made a plan to rob a train on the Saharanpur Railway lines. The robbery plan was executed by Bismil, Khan, Rajendra Lahiri, Chandrashekhar Azad, Sachindra Bakshi, Keshab Chakravarty, Manmathnath Gupta, Mukundi Lal, Murari Lal Gupta and Banwari Lal. One passenger was killed unintentionally.

Conspiracy
On 9 August 1925, the Number 8 Down Train was travelling from Shahjahanpur to Lucknow. When it passed Kakori, one of the revolutionary, Rajendra Lahiri pulled the emergency chain to stop the train and subsequently, the other revolutionaries overpowered the guard. It is believed that they looted that specific train because it was carrying the money bags (taxes) which belonged to the Indians and was being transferred to the British government treasury. They looted only these bags (which were present in the guards' cabin and contained about ₹ 4600) and escaped to Lucknow. The objectives of this robbery were to:

 Fund the HRA with the money of British administration taxed  from the Indians.
 To protest against the British administration collecting a lot of tax from Indians .
 Garner public attention by creating a positive image of the HRA among Indians.

One lawyer, Ahmad Ali, who was a passenger, had got down to see his wife in the ladies compartment and was killed in an unintentional discharge by Manmathnath Gupta, but this made it a manslaughter case. Following the incident, the British administration started an intense manhunt and arrested several of the revolutionaries who were members or part of the HRA. Their leader, Ram Prasad Bismil was arrested at Shahjahanpur on 26 October 1925 and Ashfaqullah Khan was arrested on 7 December 1926 at Delhi.

Arrests
Forty people were arrested from all over India. Their names (with the place and date of arrest) are:
From Agra
Chandra Dhar Johri – 19 November 1925
Chandra Bhal Johri – 15 November 1925
From Allahabad
Shitala Sahai – 2 November 1925
Jyoti Shankar Dixit – 11 November 1925
Bhupendra Nath Sanyal – 16 December 1925
From Orai
Veer Bhadra Tiwari – 31 October 1925
From Benares
Manmathnath Gupta – 26 September 1925
Damodar Swarup Seth – 28 September 1925
Ram Nath Pandey – 27 September 1925
Dev Dutt Bhattacharya – 21 October 1925
Indra Vikram Singh – 30 September 1925
Mukundi Lal – 17 January 1926
From Bengal
Sachindra Nath Sanyal – 10 December 1925
Jogesh Chandra Chatterjee – 21 December 1925
Rajendra Nath Lahiri – 10 January 1926
Sharat Chandra Guha – 5 October 1925
Kali Das Bose – 2 November 1925
From Etah
Babu Ram Verma – 10 November 1925
From Hardoi
Bhairon Singh – 11 November 1925
From Jabalpur
Pranawesh Chatterjee – 11 December 1925
From Kanpur
Ram Dulare Trivedi – 26 September 1925
Gopi Mohan – 25 October 1925
Raj Kumar Sinha – 31 October 1925
Suresh Chandra Bhattacharya – 26 September 1925
From Lahore
Mohan Lal Gautam – 18 November 1925
From Lakhimpur
Harnam Sundarlal – 7 November 1925
From Lucknow
Govind Charan Kar – 26 September 1925
Sachindranath Biswas – 6 October 1925
From Meerut
Vishnu Sharan Dublish – 26 September 1925
From Pune
Ram Krishna Khatri – 18 October 1925
From Raebareli
Banwari Lal – 15 December 1925
From Shahjahanpur
Ram Prasad Bismil – 26 October 1925
Banarsi Lal – 26 September 1925
Lala Hargovind – 26 September 1925
Prem Krishna Khanna – 26 September 1925  
Indubhushan Mitra – 30 September 1925
Thakur Roshan Singh – 26 September 1925
Ram Dutt Shukla – 3 October 1925
Madan Lal – 10 October 1925
Ram Ratna Shukla – 11 October 1925

Arrested later —
From Delhi
Ashfaqullah Khan – 7 December 1926
From Pratapgarh
Sachindranath Bakshi – September 1926

Of the above, Sachindranath Sanyal, Rajendra Lahiri, and Jogesh Chandra Chatterjee had already been arrested in Bengal. Lahiri was prosecuted in a Dakshineshwar bombing case, while Ashfaqullah Khan and Sachindranath Bakshi were arrested later when the main Kakori conspiracy case was over. A supplementary case was filed against these two and they were prosecuted in the same manner.

Kakori trial
Bismil and some others were charged with various offences, including robbery and murder. Fourteen people were released due to a lack of evidence. Two of the accused – Ashfaqullah Khan and Sachindranath Bakshi were captured after the trial. Chandrashekhar Azad reorganized the HRA in 1928 and operated it until his death on 27 February 1931.

Charges pressed against further three men were dropped. Damodar Swarup Seth was discharged due to illness, while Veer Bhadra Tiwari & Jyoti Shankar Dixit were suspected of providing information to the authorities. Two other individuals – Banarsi Lal and Indubhushan Mitra came to be approvers in return for a lenient sentence.

Court's proceedings
Charges against 19 of the accused were withdrawn (2 had become approvers while 17 people had been released). The trial against the remaining 21 began on 1 May 1926 at the Special Sessions Court of Justice Archibald Hamilton. Abbas Salim Khan, Banwari Lal Bhargava, Gyan Chatterjee, and Mohammad Ayuf were the assessors of the case. Of the 21 accused, two people namely Sachindranath Biswas and Lala Hargovind were released due to lack of evidence, while Gopi Mohan became an approver.

The court had appointed Jagat Narayan Mulla as public prosecutor knowingly; he had a prejudice against Ram Prasad Bismil since 1916, when Bismil led the grand procession of Bal Gangadhar Tilak at Lucknow. He had also been the public prosecutor in the Mainpuri conspiracy case of 1918.

The government officers had also bribed many of the accused to become government approvers. The trials were mainly based on the statements given by Banwari Lal who had met the revolutionaries and was also involved in the planning the robbery activities taken up by the group in Bamrauli (25 December 1924), Bichpuri (9 March 1925) & Dwarikapur (25 May 1925). So, his statement was used as the main evidence to prove the HRA members guilty.

The judgement of the case trials of Sessions Court was pronounced on 6 April 1927 as follows —

Ram Prasad Bismil, Roshan Singh and Rajendra Nath Lahiri were sentenced to death. Sachindranath Sanyal was given life imprisonment. Manmathnath Gupta was sentenced to 14 years' imprisonment. Jogesh Chandra Chatterjee, Govind Charan Kar, Raj Kumar Sinha, Ram Krishna Khatri and Mukundi Lal were sentenced to 10 years' imprisonment, while Suresh Chandra Bhattacharya and Vishnu Sharan Dublish were given 7 years' imprisonment. Bhupendra Nath Sanyal, Ram Dulare Trivedi, Prem Krishna Khanna and Pranawesh Chatterjee were sentenced to imprisonment for 5 years' and the least punishment (3 years' imprisonment) was given to Ram Nath Pandey and Banwari Lal.

Final verdict
Following the arrest of Ashfaqullah Khan, the police interrogated him to try to gain supplementary evidence against his accomplices but he refused. Another supplementary case was filed against Ashfaqulla Khan and Sachindranath Bakshi in the court of Special Sessions Judge John Reginald William Bennett. An appeal was filed in the then Chief Court of Oudh (now in Uttar Pradesh) on 18 July 1927. The case trials started the next day. The judgement of the trial was pronounced a month later on 11 August.

The punishments were given as follows:

 Death sentence: Ram Prasad Bismil, Roshan Singh, Rajendra Nath Lahiri and Ashfaqullah Khan
 Deportation to Kala Pani (Port Blair Cellular Jail): Sachindranath Sanyal, Sachindranath Bakshi, Govind Charan Kar, Jogesh Chandra Chatterjee and Mukundi Lal
 14 years' imprisonment: Manmathnath Gupta
 10 years' imprisonment: Raj Kumar Sinha, Vishnu Sharan Dublish, Ram Krishna Khatri and Suresh Chandra Bhattacharya
 5 years' imprisonment: Bhupendranath Sanyal, Prem Krishna Khanna, Banwari Lal and Ram Dulare Trivedi 
 4 years' imprisonment: Pranawesh Chatterjee  
 3 years' imprisonment: Ram Nath Pandey

Hunger strike in the jail
After the court gave the judgement of the main Kakori Conspiracy Case on 6 April 1927, a group photograph was taken and all the accused were sent to the different jails of the United Provinces. In the prisons, they were asked to wear jail uniforms like the other prisoners which lead to immediate protests and hunger strikes. The revolutionaries argued that since they had been charged with crimes against the British rule (and supposedly overturning the British Raj), they should be treated as political prisoners and thus should possess the rights and amenities provided to political prisoners.

The details of their hunger strike are listed below:

Defense committee
The legal defence for the arrested revolutionaries was provided by Govind Ballabh Pant, Mohan Lal Saxena, Chandra Bhanu Gupta, Ajit Prasad Jain, Gopi Nath Srivastava, R. M. Bahadurji, B. K. Chaudhury and Kripa Shankar Hajela.

Pandit Jagat Narayan Mulla, a leading advocate from Lucknow and uncle-in-law of Pt. Jawaharlal Nehru refused to defend the arrested revolutionaries. He was appointed as public prosecutor by the law of court.

Among the political figures who came out in support of those arrested for the Kakori train robbery were: Motilal Nehru, Madan Mohan Malaviya, Muhammad Ali Jinnah, Lala Lajpat Rai, Jawaharlal Nehru , Ganesh Shankar Vidyarthi, Shiv Prasad Gupta, Shri Prakash and Acharya Narendra Dev.

Reaction in the country

There were widespread protests against the court's decision all over the country. Members of the Central Legislature even petitioned the Viceroy of India to commute the death sentences given to the four men to life sentences. Appeals were also sent to the Privy Council. However, these requests were turned down and the men were finally executed. Appeals were claimed to have been also made by Mahatma Gandhi, despite his lack of executive authority.

Clemency appeal
On 11 August 1927, the Chief Court endorsed the original judgement with an exception of one (7 yrs) punishment from the judgement of 6 April. A mercy appeal was filed in due course before the Provincial Governor of U.P. by the members of the legislative council which was dismissed. Ram Prasad Bismil wrote a letter to Madan Mohan Malaviya on 9 September 1927 from Gorakhpur Jail. Malviya sent a memorandum to the then Viceroy and Governor-General of India Lord Irwin with the signatures of 78 Members of Central Legislature, which was also turned down.

On 16 September 1927, the final mercy appeal was forwarded to Privy Council at London and to the King-Emperor through a famous lawyer of England, Henry S. L. Polak, but the British Government, who had already decided to hang them, sent their final decision to the India office of Viceroy that all the four condemned prisoners were to be hanged till death by 19 December 1927 positively.

See also
Ashfaqulla Khan
Sukhdev Thapar
Shivaram Rajguru

References

Further reading
 

1925 crimes in India
Railway accidents in 1925
August 1925 events
Indian independence movement in Uttar Pradesh
Revolutionary movement for Indian independence
History of Lucknow
Train robberies
Hindustan Socialist Republican Association
Robberies in India